Simple Sum is the first studio album by Australian singer-songwriter, Wes Carr. Carr recorded the album in 2007 at Sydney's Electric Avenue Studios. The album was released independently and features tracks that were written by Carr, including many at the age of fourteen and fifteen. The album was released digitally on 11 June 2008.

Track listing

Background
"Cherrokee Dream" was written about the nightmares Carr used to suffer as a child. In fact, his song choice for Australian Idol's top 4 American Hits night, "What A Wonderful World", was inspired by this very fact. Carr listened to the song as a child frequently, and on repeat, to help him sleep.

The song "Elsie Brown (Simple Sum)" was written by Carr in 2003, inspired by a news story he read about a lady of that name, who died alone in her Sydney home and was speculated to have been left undiscovered for up to 22 months. She was elderly and neighbours claimed she rarely left her house or had visitors.

References

External links
 Download "Simple Sum"

2008 debut albums
Wes Carr albums